Connon is a hamlet near Liskeard in Cornwall, England. Connon is in the civil parish of St Pinnock.

References

Hamlets in Cornwall